Coelidiinae is a subfamily of leafhoppers in the family Cicadellidae. There are at least 8 tribes, 108 genera, and over 900 species in Coelidiinae.

Tribes
The subfamily Coelidiinae is made up of these tribes. The number of genera and species are estimates, and change from time to time.
 Coelidiini Dohrn, F., 1859 - 51 genera and 343 species
 Gabritini Nielson, 1983 - 1 genus and 4 species
 Hikangiini Nielson, 1983 - 2 genera and 6 species
 Macroceratogoniini Kirkaldy, 1906 - 1 genus
 Sandersellini DeLong, 1945 - 1 genus and 9 species
 Teruliini Nielson, 1979 - 49 genera and 283 species
 Thagriini Distant, 1908 - 2 genera and 184 species
 Tharrini Nielson, 1975 - 3 genera and 105 species
 Tinobregmini Oman, 1949 - 5 genera and 7 species
 Youngolidiini Nielson, 1983 - 5 genera and 39 species

References

Further reading

External links

 
 

 
Cicadellidae